Kai Jahnsson (born January 25, 1965, in Helsinki, Finland) is a Finnish sport shooter who competes in the men's 10 metre air pistol. At the 2012 Summer Olympics, he finished 8th in the final round. He works for the Finnish Border Guard, is married and has three children.

References

Finnish male sport shooters
Living people
Olympic shooters of Finland
Shooters at the 2008 Summer Olympics
Shooters at the 2012 Summer Olympics
1965 births
Sportspeople from Helsinki